Anupama: Namaste America is an Indian Hindi-language drama television series which aired on 25 April 2022 on Disney+ Hotstar. Produced by Rajan Shahi and Ishika Shahi under Director's Kut Productions, it stars Rupali Ganguly and Sudhanshu Pandey. It is an eleven-episode prequel series to Star Plus's Hindi television series Anupamaa which concluded on 6 May 2022.

Premise
The story is set 17 years ago in 2005, ten years after Anupama and Vanraj's marriage, when Anupama was Vanraj's wife and a mother to Paritosh and Samar, she had an opportunity to fulfil her dream in the USA. However, some conditions forced her to quit her dream and become the Anupama shown in the initial episodes of Anupamaa.

Cast

Main
Rupali Ganguly as Anupama "Anu" Vanraj Shah: Kanta's daughter; Bhavesh's sister; Vanraj's wife; Paritosh and Samar's mother
Sudhanshu Pandey as Vanraj "Guthlu" Shah: Leela and Hasmukh's son; Dolly's brother; Ritika's former boyfriend; Anupama's husband; Paritosh and Samar's father
Sarita Joshi as Mrs. Shah aka Moti Baa: Hasmukh's mother; Vanraj and Dolly's grandmother; Paritosh and Samar's great-grandmother
Vidhvaan Sharma as Young Samar "Bakuda" Shah: Anupama and Vanraj's younger son; Paritosh's brother
Dheer Bhanushali as Young Paritosh "Toshu" Shah: Anupama and Vanraj's elder son; Samar's brother

Recurring

Puja Banerjee as Ritika: Ravi's wife; Vanraj's former girlfriend
Arvind Vaidya as Hasmukh Shah aka Bapuji: Moti Baa's son; Leela's husband; Vanraj and Dolly's father; Paritosh and Samar's grandfather
Alpana Buch as Leela Shah aka Baa: Hasmukh's wife; Vanraj and Dolly's mother; Paritosh and Samar's grandmother
Ekta Saraiya as Dolly Shah Dhamecha: Leela and Hasmukh's daughter; Vanraj's sister; Sanjay's wife
Gaurav Khanna as Anuj "AK" Kapadia: Owner of Kapadia Group of Industries; Gopichandra's foster son; Malvika's adoptive brother; Anupama's one-sided lover
Madalsa Sharma Chakraborty as Kavya Aniruddh Gandhi: Aniruddh's wife
Paresh Bhatt as Sanjay Dhamecha: Dolly's husband
Mehul Buch as Mr. Dhamecha: Sanjay's father
Pallavi Pradhan as Mrs. Dhamecha: Sanjay's mother
Arup Pal as Vanraj's manager
Shilpa Kataria Singh as Vanraj's manager's wife
Pragati Mehra as Dr. Pragati Mehra: Anupama's gynecologists
Riyaz Panjwani as Mr. Dholakia: Vanraj's colleague
Sachin Tyagi as the Anuj's heart voice in the final episode

Episodes

Production

Development
Rajan Shahi the producer of Anupamaa announced to make a prequel web series to Star Plus TV series Anupamaa.

Casting
Though most of the cast from original series were retained including Rupali Ganguly, Sudhanshu Pandey, Arvind Vaidya, Alpana Buch, Ekta Saraiya and Paresh Bhatt reprising their original roles as Anupama, Vanraj, Hasmukh, Leela, Dolly and Sanjay respectively. Paras Kalnawat and Ashish Mehrotra playing Samar and Paritosh respectively were not cast for the series due to their characters being portrayed as younger children, thus their roles were assigned to child actors Vidhvaan Sharma and Dheer Bhanushali respectively. Muskaan Bamne playing Pakhi was also excluded from the cast because her character was yet to be born. While Madalsa Sharma Chakraborty's character Kavya Gandhi was excluded however Chakraborty reprised her role in the last episode. A new character, played by Puja Banerjee, Ritika, was included as Vanraj's college-days girlfriend. Aneri Vajani and Nidhi Shah's roles Malvika and Kinjal respectively were eliminated from the series. Sarita Joshi was cast to play Hasmukh's mother Moti Baa. Later Gaurav Khanna also reprised his role of Anuj Kapadia in the last episode. In further episodes, Mehul Buch and Pallavi Pradhan were cast as Sanjay's parents, Mr. and Mrs. Dhamecha. Pragati Mehra was seen playing the role of gynaecologist. The series concluded with Sachin Tyagi narrating the characters' futures with a poem, leading to the current story of Anupamaa.

Filming
The series has been shot on the original sets of Anupamaa with some changes in Film City, Mumbai.

Broadcast
The eleven-episode series premiered on Disney+ Hotstar on 25 April 2022, with each episode being uploaded daily and concluded on 6 May 2022.

Sequel
Anupamaa, a sequel to the drama series premiered on 13 July 2020 on Star Plus, and digitally streams on Disney+ Hotstar. It is based on Star Jalsha's Bengali series Sreemoyee, and stars Rupali Ganguly, Gaurav Khanna and Sudhanshu Pandey.

Reception
Arushi Jain of Indian Express wrote "I feel the show is only an extension of what we saw in the first six months of its televised version: it tells you what all Anupama ‘jheloed’ in her marriage with Vanraj. Only this time, Ganguly has kept Anupama chirpy and lively, but she also delivers enough sad-but-c’est-la-vie expressions into the camera".

References

External links
Production Website
Anupama: Namaste America on Disney+ Hotstar

2022 Indian television series debuts
Hindi-language television shows
2022 Indian television seasons